The 2013–14 snooker season was a series of snooker tournaments played between 6 June 2013 and 5 May 2014. From this season every qualifying match was held open to the public at various venues in the United Kingdom, replacing the World Snooker Academy in Sheffield. The number of wild-card players at the Chinese ranking events, except the Shanghai Masters, was reduced from eight to four and former Main Tour players were excluded. A professional player could not be selected for more than one wild-card match during the season.

In all but three tournaments, every player participated in round one featuring 64 seeds for the first time in the history of snooker. In nine of the ranking tournaments all players took part in the first round, with the winners travelling to the final venue. At three events, the UK Championship, the Welsh Open and the PTC Finals, all matches were held at the final venue. The only three events using the old system were the Australian Goldfields Open, the Shanghai Masters and the World Championship. If a seeded player lost his first-round match in these events, then only half of the prize money counted to his official ranking. This was used in all tournaments following the 2012 World Championship.

The season had a total of at least £8 million of prize money. The World Championship, the UK Championship, the International Championship and the Masters were the four biggest tournaments in terms of prize money with the total pot being at least £600,000 at each event. The Indian Open became the first ranking event held in India, and the Champion of Champions was held again after 1980 replacing the Premier League Snooker. At the end of the season Ronnie O'Sullivan was named the World Snooker Player of the Year and the Fans Player of the Year, Ding Junhui the Snooker Writers Player of the Year and John Astley the Rookie of the Year. Mark Selby received the "Performance of the Year" and "The Magic Moment of the Year" awards for winning his first World title and compiling the 100th maximum break in the history of snooker. Dennis Taylor and Cliff Thorburn were inducted into the Hall of Fame.

Neil Robertson became the first player in the history of snooker to compile one hundred century breaks in a season. While Ding Junhui equalled Stephen Hendry's then record of winning five major ranking titles in a season by claiming the Shanghai Masters, the Indian Open, the International Championship, the German Masters and the China Open.

New professional players 

Countries:

 
 
 
 
 
 
 
 
 
 
 
 
 
 
 

The 2013/2014 season was made up of 132 professional players. The top 64 players after the 2013 World Championship and the 32 players earning a two-year card the previous year, who hadn't already earned a place, automatically qualified for the 2013/2014 season, as have eight players from the PTC Order of Merit of the Players Tour Championship and four players from the APTC Order of Merit, who have not already qualified for the Main Tour. Another three players came from the EBSA Qualifying Tour Play-Offs, and a further twelve places were available through the Q School. The rest of the places on to the tour came from amateur events and national governing body nominations. All players listed below received a tour card for two seasons.

IBSF World Under-21 Snooker Championship winner:  Lyu Haotian
EBSA European Snooker Championships winner:  Robin Hull
EBSA European Under-21 Snooker Championships winner:  James Cahill
ACBS Asian Under-21 Snooker Championship winner:  Noppon Saengkham
ABSF African Snooker Championship runner-up:  Khaled Belaid Abumdas

NGB nominations

PTC Order of Merit

EBSA Qualifying Tour Play-Offs

APTC Order of Merit

Q School
Event 1

Event 2

Event 3

Calendar 
The following table outlines the results and dates for all the ranking and major invitational events.

World Snooker Tour

World Ladies Billiards and Snooker Association

Seniors events

Other events

Official rankings

Seeding revision 1

Seeding revision 2

Seeding revision 3

Seeding revision 4

Seeding revision 5

Seeding revision 6

Seeding revision 7

World ranking points

Points distribution 
2013/2014 points distribution for world ranking and minor-ranking events:

Notes

References

External links

2013
Season 2014
Season 2013